Prasophyllum apoxychilum, commonly known as the tapered leek orchid, is a species of orchid endemic to Tasmania. It has a single tubular, green leaf with a purplish base and up to twenty light green and whitish flowers. It is very similar to P. truncatum, and there is some doubt as to whether the two species are distinct. The species is known from twenty widely separated populations and is usually only seen in disturbed sites, such as after fire.

Description
As with others in the genus, the flowers are inverted so that the labellum is above the column rather than below it. The petals are a similar size to the lateral sepals or slightly shorter and have a dark central band. Flowering occurs from October to December and is stimulated by disturbance, such as by fire or mowing.

Taxonomy and naming
Prasophyllum apoxychilum was first formally described in 1998 by David Jones from a specimen collected near Murdunna and the description was published in Australian Orchid Research. The specific epithet (apoxychilum) derived from the Ancient Greek words apoxys meaning "tapering" and cheilos meaning "lip" referring to the pointed labellum.

Prasophyllum apoxychilum is very similar to P. truncatum and the characteristics previously thought to distinguish them are variable within each.

Distribution and habitat
The tapered leek orchid grows in forest with an understorey of grasses or dense shrubs. It has been recorded from areas around Hobart and to its south-east, along the northern and eastern coastal areas. It seems to benefit from disturbance and one population flowers regularly, growing in an areas slashed under electric power lines.

Conservation
Prasophyllum apoxychilum is known from twenty, sometimes widely separated populations, containing a total of one thousand plants. The species is classified as Vulnerable under the Tasmanian Threatened Species Protection Act 1995 and as Endangered under the Commonwealth Government Environment Protection and Biodiversity Conservation Act 1999 (EPBC) Act.

References

apoxychilum
Endemic flora of Tasmania
Endemic orchids of Australia
Plants described in 1998